Cornelius Robinson Coffey (September 6, 1902, Newport, Arkansas – March 2, 1994, Chicago, Illinois) was an American aviator. Alongside Willa Brown, he was the first African American to create a non-university-affiliated aeronautical school in the United States.

Career
Coffey helped integrate African American pilots into the American aviation industry. He worked with his friend John C. Robinson, together, they formed the Challenger Air Pilots Association.

He opened the Coffey School of Aeronautics in Robbins, Illinois with his wife, Willa Brown, where many African American pilots were trained, including some of the Tuskegee Airmen. The school moved to the former Harlem Airport, which was located at 87th Street and Harlem Avenue in the late 1930s. After World War II, he taught aeronautics at the Lewis Holy Name School of Aeronautics in Romeoville, Illinois and at Chicago's Dunbar Vocational High School.

Awards and honors
He received the Dwight H. Green Trophy in 1941. He was honored with a day by the City of Chicago on July 22, 1980. He was inducted into the Illinois Aviation Hall of Fame in 1984.
In September 2023 Coffey will be inducted into the National Aviation Hall of Fame in Dayton, Ohio.

Legacy
The Cornelius R. Coffey Aviation Education Foundation was established at the American Airlines Maintenance Academy in Chicago in his honor to train young pilots.

Pilots flying to Midway Airport make a course correction over Lake Calumet which is known as the Coffey Fix. Coffey's Piper Tri-Pacer 135 aircraft was scheduled to be on exhibit from 2016 at the Octave Chanute Aerospace Museum as part of the exhibit, Barnstormers, Wing-walkers, and Entrepreneurs: 150 Years of Aviation in Illinois.

References

Further reading
Garrett, Jim. "Coffey, Cornelius Robinson" in African American National Biography. Oxford: Oxford University Press, 2006.
Lambertson, Giles. 'The Other Harlem', Air & Space Smithsonian, 2010, vol. 24, no.7, pp. 54–59.
Hart, Philip S. Flying Free: America's First Black Aviators. Minneapolis, Minn: Lerner Publications Co, 1992. 
Hunt, Rufus A. The Cofey Intersection. Chicago: J.R.D.B. Enterprises, 1982.

External links
 Cornelius Coffey profile
 Interview with three Tuskegee Airmen: Robert Martin, Dr. Quentin P. Smith, and Shelby Westbrook at the Pritzker Military Museum & Library in October 2008

People from Newport, Arkansas
People from Chicago
African-American history of the United States military
1902 births
1994 deaths
African-American aviators
Aviators from Arkansas
Aviators from Illinois